The 2005 San Diego Toreros football team represented the University of San Diego as a member of the North Division of the Pioneer Football League (PFL) during the 2005 NCAA Division I FCS football season. In their second year under head coach Jim Harbaugh, the Toreros compiled an 11–1 record, outscored their opponents 511 to 205, and won the PFL championship.

Schedule

References

San Diego
San Diego Toreros football seasons
Pioneer Football League champion seasons
San Diego Toreros football